Brookfield is a suburb of Tauranga, in the Bay of Plenty Region of New Zealand's North Island.

Demographics

Brookfield had a population of 5,754 at the 2018 New Zealand census, an increase of 606 people (11.8%) since the 2013 census, and an increase of 804 people (16.2%) since the 2006 census. There were 2,094 households, comprising 2,814 males and 2,940 females, giving a sex ratio of 0.96 males per female, with 1,329 people (23.1%) aged under 15 years, 1,143 (19.9%) aged 15 to 29, 2,448 (42.5%) aged 30 to 64, and 831 (14.4%) aged 65 or older.

Ethnicities were 79.0% European/Pākehā, 21.5% Māori, 3.3% Pacific peoples, 8.5% Asian, and 1.9% other ethnicities. People may identify with more than one ethnicity.

The percentage of people born overseas was 20.5, compared with 27.1% nationally.

Although some people chose not to answer the census's question about religious affiliation, 52.2% had no religion, 33.5% were Christian, 2.2% had Māori religious beliefs, 0.8% were Hindu, 0.5% were Muslim, 0.4% were Buddhist and 3.6% had other religions.

Of those at least 15 years old, 849 (19.2%) people had a bachelor's or higher degree, and 762 (17.2%) people had no formal qualifications. 519 people (11.7%) earned over $70,000 compared to 17.2% nationally. The employment status of those at least 15 was that 2,262 (51.1%) people were employed full-time, 654 (14.8%) were part-time, and 198 (4.5%) were unemployed.

Education

References

Suburbs of Tauranga
Populated places around the Tauranga Harbour